This is the list of mines located in Estonia. The list is incomplete.

References 

Mineral deposits
Mineral deposits
Estonia